The Ambassador of Malaysia to the Kingdom of Belgium is the head of Malaysia's diplomatic mission to Belgium. The position has the rank and status of an Ambassador Extraordinary and Plenipotentiary and is based in the Embassy of Malaysia, Brussels.

List of heads of mission

Ambassadors to Belgium

See also
 Belgium–Malaysia relations

References 

 
Belgium
Malaysia